Patrick Thornton (4 May 1904 – 1 February 1961) was a South African cricketer. He played in six first-class matches for Border in 1933/34.

See also
 List of Border representative cricketers

References

External links
 

1904 births
1961 deaths
South African cricketers
Border cricketers
Cricketers from Cape Town